Arkell is a surname. Notable people with the surname include:

 A. J. Arkell (1898–1980), English archaeologist and colonial administrator
 Frank Arkell (1935–1998), Australian politician
 Henry Arkell (1898–1982), English cricketer
 John Arkell (1835–1923), English rower and clergyman
 Keith Arkell (born 1961), English chess grandmaster
 Myles Arkell (born 1932), English cricketer
 Reginald Arkell (1882–1959), English writer
 Simon Arkell (born 1966), Australian Olympic pole vaulter
 Thomas Arkell (1823–1906), English-Canadian politician
 Valerie Arkell-Smith (1895–1960), an English transgender man better known as Colonel Sir Victor Barker
 William Joscelyn Arkell (1904–1958), English geologist and paleontologist

See also
 Arkell Cirque, large cirque on the south face of the central Read Mountains in Antarctica
 Arkell Museum, American art and historical museum in Canajoharie, New York
 Arkell Spring Grounds, bedrock aquifer along the Eramosa River in Ontario, Canada
 Arkell's Brewery, privately held English brewery in Swindon
 Arkells, Canadian rock band
 Arkell v. Pressdram a legal case involving Private Eye
 Arkell, Ontario, part of Puslinch, Ontario